Molière is an impact crater on the planet Mercury, 139 kilometers in diameter. It is located south of the crater Rodin, southeast of the crater Abu Nuwas, and northeast of the crater Asvaghosa. The nearly circular rim of the crater is cut off into a flat edge on its southern and southwestern ends, and on its eastern side the rim is indented by a smaller crater. The crater is named for the 17th-century French dramatist and satirist Molière. The name was approved by the International Astronomical Union in 1976.

Views

References

Impact craters on Mercury
Molière